Taylor Madrigal, known by the stage name DJ Tiiiiiiiiiip, is a Minneapolis, Minnesota based DJ and promoter.

Tiiiiiiiiiip grew up in Minneapolis. His stage name is an alteration of his childhood nickname, Tip. In 2009, he became a founding member of rap collective Audio Perm. He produced beats for the group. He later formed half of the duo Biter Fighters with Unfuh Qwittable of Audio Perm.

Tiiiiiiiiiip began DJing in 2010. He joined Thestand4rd on tour in 2014. He became the official DJ of the group and served as one of their producers. He has since collaborated with artists such as Bobby Raps, Allan Kingdom, Spooky Black, Aaron Carter, and Yung Gravy. Tiiiiiiiiiip and Bobby Raps perform together as duo Dequexatron X000.

In 2016, Tiiiiiiiiiip contributed to Watch the Stove, a viral mixtape campaign by Hamburger Helper. He featured on "Feed the Streets", the opening track of the album.

Tiiiiiiiiiip has been outspoken about preventing sexual harassment during his DJ sets.

References

American DJs
Musicians from Minneapolis
Living people
Year of birth missing (living people)